Darr @ the Mall is an Indian horror film directed by Pawan Kripalani of Ragini MMS fame. The film was released on 21 February 2014 and stars Jimmy Sheirgill and Nushrat Bharucha in the lead roles. The film is produced by Multi Screen Media and Contiloe Entertainment.

Plot
A new mall called Amity mall has opened up, owned by Mr Manchanda (Arif Zakaria) and Mr Khan (Asif Basra) who claim it to be Asia's largest mall. 
The film starts off with a security guard talking to someone on phone but displays being paranoid. He looks towards a smokey apparation and begs it to let him go, but a chase ensues and he rapidly gets into his car, trying to escape but while going through the ramps of the basement, the car crashes and the man is eventually killed by an unknown force who strangled him using the seat belt.

A week later, Vishnu (Jimmy Shergill) goes to the mall to apply for the position of Head of security. Mr Khan interviews him but is interrupted by Tischa, the marketing director who says there's something important he must attend to. Mr Khan joins the others(Mr Manchanda, Mr Saini and Tischa) in a meeting room where the TV shows a news reporter covering up on the death of the security guard. The mall is reputed as being haunted because of various deaths of construction workers and mall staff and hence people refrain from working there, but Mr Khan hires Vishnu after he agrees to work there despite the claims. Vishnu quickly changes into his uniform in the locker room where the locker of the previous guard(who was killed) mysteriously opens, where a file falls down. On examining it, Vishnu finds photographs of camera footage from various areas of the mall all with the smokey apparation caught on camera.
He catches someone spying on him and on confronting, it turns out to be a small girl whom he questions about her parents, but while he is distracted, the girl disappears. Vishnu seems perplexed but soon brushes it off and continues to the surveillance room along with his assistant, Rana. He does a quick search of the room and finds a some spilled jam which comes of as rather suspicious to him. 
He then sends Rana to check all cameras to make sure they're working but while in the basement, the storage room door opens by itself and on being ordered by Vishnu, Rana checks it out, but is shortly killed by an unknown apparation.

Vishnu gets some radio static on his walkie talkie a few times which forces him to go to the storage room to check on Rana. On checking the room, he doesn't find Rana but we're shown few body parts belonging to him stored on the shelf, proving that he was dismembered.

There is an opening of the mall including a lavish party where Mr. Khan and Mr. Manchanda inform the media that they will stay at the mall with their kids just to prove the mall is not haunted. This goes awry as people start getting killed by the same dark figure whereas Vishnu keeps getting random things (a small old box with random trinkets, pennies etc).

He also has random apparitions of a small girl. Eventually Mr. Khan's son is killed and he exclaims that they should not have done what they did the other night and Mr. Manchanda is to be blamed for his son's death. They keep running away and eventually a ghostly dark figure strangles Mr. Khan leaving Mr. Manchanda his daughter Ahana and Vishnu alive.

They try to escape via AC ducts but an unknown force pulls Vishnu away and he gets separated from Ahana and her father. There he sees the small girl again who reminds him that he was in fact Arjun and they all lived together in an orphanage which belonged to Mother who was in charge of the 22 kids. She was very loving and caring but also strict. One day Arjun was stealing some jam and on hearing some noise hides in the cupboard and hears the transaction between Mr. Khan, Mr. Manchanda and Mother for the land on which the orphanage was built but Mother declines the offer and sends them away.

She gets Arjun from the cupboard but hears some commotion and goes to check but is struck by Mr. Khan and they bring some henchmen and burn the entire orphanage including Mother. Arjun escapes but has forgotten about it.

He remembers everyone and everything and questions Mr. Manchanda but Mr. Manchanda is pulled back into the flashback and is shown the gruesome scene is which the kids and mother were burnt to death. He dies the same way before Ahana and Vishnu.

Vishnu and Ahana are escaping when she is pulled and thrown against a pillar violently. Vishnu goes to help her but notices her skin being set on fire, he begs Mother to forgive her but when he sees that is not helping he hugs Ahana in order to be killed with her but seeing him being burnt Mother spares them both and leaves with the 21 kids in a white light having attained salvation. Ahana and Vishnu leave the mall together in bright daylight.

Cast
Jimmy Sheirgill as Vishnu Sharma/Arjun
Nushrat Bharucha as Ahana Manchanda
Arif Zakaria as Alok Manchanda
Asif Basra as Javed Khan
Nivedita Bhattacharya as Tisha
Vikram Raj Bhardwaj as KD 
Shraddha Kaul as Mother Madeline
Neeraj Khetrapal as Sahni
Yaushika Varma as Mandy
Anadya Sharma as the little girl 
Geet Sharma as Nanau
Pramod Pathak as Rana
Neeraj Sood as Rajendra Solanki, mall security guard
Charlotte Desmond
Rahul Mishra
Vishal Jethwa
Danish Akhtar
Amit Roy

Promotion
Darr @ The Mall has done over 8 television show integrations. The movie is promoted at a Sony TV Shows Adaalat, Bhoot Aaya, CID, Fear Files: Darr Ki Sacchi Tasvirein on Zee TV, Taarak Mehta Ka Ooltah Chashmah on SAB TV, Chidiya Ghar on SAB TV, F.I.R. on SAB TV. The Official Music Launch was on Boogie Woogie Kids Championship the episode of which aired on 18 January 2014

Music 

The soundtrack of the film is given by Shankar–Ehsaan–Loy, while the lyrics are written by Amitabh Bhattacharya. The album includes three original tracks, one remix track and one instrumental track released on T-Series.

Track listing

Critical reception
DNA India said that The Mall is a spine chilling tale of one night and an encounter with the past.

References

External links
 
 

2010s Hindi-language films
Indian horror films
Indian mystery films
2014 films
2014 horror films
Sony Pictures Networks India films
2010s mystery films
Hindi-language horror films
Sony Pictures films
Columbia Pictures films